Jean Gaubert (born 3 March 1947) was a member of the National Assembly of France.  He represented Côtes-d'Armor's 2nd constituency for three periods, 1985-1986, then 1992-1993 and then 1997-2012, as a member of the Socialiste, radical, citoyen et divers gauche.

References

1947 births
Living people
People from Côtes-d'Armor
Politicians from Brittany
Socialist Party (France) politicians
Deputies of the 9th National Assembly of the French Fifth Republic
Deputies of the 11th National Assembly of the French Fifth Republic
Deputies of the 12th National Assembly of the French Fifth Republic
Deputies of the 13th National Assembly of the French Fifth Republic